Almalu (also Romanized as Ālmālū; also known as Bāsh Ālmālū, Almāli Bāsh, Ālmālū Bāsh, and Alniāli-bāsh) is a village in Kuhestan Rural District, Qaleh Chay District, Ajab Shir County, East Azerbaijan Province, Iran. At the 2006 census, its population was 1,386, in 308 families.

References 

Populated places in Ajab Shir County